The ABC Natural History Unit was a department of the Australian Broadcasting Corporation, formed out of a desire to consolidate the Corporation's growing number of nature-related programs. The unit was based at the ABC's Southbank offices in Melbourne, and won numerous awards. In 2007 the unit was closed, and all nature programming outsourced.

Notable people
 David Parer

References

External links
 ABC Natural History Unit

Australian Broadcasting Corporation divisions